Plant genetics is the study of genes, genetic variation, and heredity specifically in plants. It is generally considered a field of biology and botany, but intersects frequently with many other life sciences and is strongly linked with the study of information systems. Plant genetics is similar in many ways to animal genetics but differs in a few key areas.

The discoverer of genetics was Gregor Mendel, a late 19th-century scientist and Augustinian friar. Mendel studied "trait inheritance", patterns in the way traits are handed down from parents to offspring. He observed that organisms (most famously pea plants) inherit traits by way of discrete "units of inheritance". This term, still used today, is a somewhat ambiguous definition of what is referred to as a gene. Much of Mendel's work with plants still forms the basis for modern plant genetics.

Plants, like all known organisms, use DNA to pass on their traits. Animal genetics often focuses on parentage and lineage, but this can sometimes be difficult in plant genetics due to the fact that plants can, unlike most animals, be self-fertile. Speciation can be easier in many plants due to unique genetic abilities, such as being well adapted to polyploidy. Plants are unique in that they are able to produce energy-dense carbohydrates via photosynthesis, a process which is achieved by use of chloroplasts. Chloroplasts, like the superficially similar mitochondria, possess their own DNA. Chloroplasts thus provide an additional reservoir for genes and genetic diversity, and an extra layer of genetic complexity not found in animals.

The study of plant genetics has major economic impacts: many staple crops are genetically modified to increase yields, confer pest and disease resistance, provide resistance to herbicides, or to increase their nutritional value.

History

The earliest evidence of plant domestication found has been dated to 11,000 years before present in ancestral wheat. While initially selection may have happened unintentionally, it is very likely that by 5,000 years ago farmers had a basic understanding of heredity and inheritance, the foundation of genetics. This selection over time gave rise to new crop species and varieties that are the basis of the crops we grow, eat and research today.

The field of plant genetics began with the work of Gregor Johann Mendel, who is often called the "father of genetics". He was an Augustinian priest and scientist born on 20 July 1822 in Austria-Hungary. He worked at the Abbey of St. Thomas in Brünn (now Brno, Czech Republic), where his organism of choice for studying inheritance and traits was the pea plant. Mendel's work tracked many phenotypic traits of pea plants, such as their height, flower color, and seed characteristics. Mendel showed that the inheritance of these traits follows two particular laws, which were later named after him. His seminal work on genetics, “Versuche über Pflanzen-Hybriden” (Experiments on Plant Hybrids), was published in 1866, but went almost entirely unnoticed until 1900 when prominent botanists in the UK, like Sir Gavin de Beer, recognized its importance and re-published an English translation. Mendel died in 1884. The significance of Mendel's work was not recognized until the turn of the 20th century. Its rediscovery prompted the foundation of modern genetics. His discoveries, deduction of segregation ratios, and subsequent laws have not only been used in research to gain a better understanding of plant genetics, but also play a large role in plant breeding. Mendel's works along with the works of Charles Darwin and Alfred Wallace on selection provided the basis for much of genetics as a discipline.

In the early 1900s, botanists and statisticians began to examine the segregation ratios put forth by Mendel. W.E. Castle discovered that while individual traits may segregate and change over time with selection, that when selection is stopped and environmental effects are taken into account, the genetic ratio stops changing and reach a sort of stasis, the foundation of Population Genetics. This was independently discovered by G. H. Hardy and W. Weinberg, which ultimately gave rise to the concept of Hardy–Weinberg equilibrium published in 1908.

For a more thorough exploration of the history of population genetics, see History of Population Genetics by Bob Allard.

Around this same time, genetic and plant breeding experiments in maize began. Maize that has been self-pollinated experiences a phenomenon called inbreeding depression. Researchers, like Nils Heribert-Nilsson, recognized that by crossing plants and forming hybrids, they were not only able to combine traits from two desirable parents, but the crop also experienced heterosis or hybrid vigor. This was the beginning of identifying gene interactions or epistasis. By the early 1920s, Donald Forsha Jones had invented a method that led to the first hybrid maize seed that were available commercially. The large demand for hybrid seed in the U.S. Corn Belt by the mid 1930s led to a rapid growth in the seed production industry and ultimately seed research. The strict requirements for producing hybrid seed led to the development of careful population and inbred line maintenance, keeping plants isolated and unable to out-cross, which produced plants that better allowed researchers to tease out different genetic concepts. The structure of these populations allowed scientist such a T. Dobzhansky, S. Wright, and R.A. Fisher to develop evolutionary biology concepts as well as explore speciation over time and the statistics underlying plant genetics.  Their work laid the foundations for future genetic discoveries such as linkage disequilibrium in 1960.

While breeding experiments were taking place, other scientists such as Nikolai Vavilov and Charles M. Rick were interested in wild progenitor species of modern crop plants. Botanists between the 1920s and 1960s often would travel to regions of high plant diversity and seek out wild species that had given rise to domesticated species after selection. Determining how crops changed over time with selection was initially based on morphological features. It developed over time to chromosomal analysis, then genetic marker analysis, and eventual genomic analysis. Identifying traits and their underlying genetics allowed for transferring useful genes and the traits they controlled from either wild or mutant plants to crop plants. Understanding and manipulating of plant genetics was in its heyday during the Green Revolution brought about by Norman Borlaug. During this time, the molecule of heredity, DNA, was also discovered, which allowed scientists to actually examine and manipulate genetic information directly.

DNA

Deoxyribonucleic acid (DNA) is a nucleic acid that contains the genetic instructions used in the development and functioning of all known living organisms and some viruses. The main role of DNA molecules is the long-term storage of information. DNA is often compared to a set of blueprints or a recipe, or a code, since it contains the instructions needed to construct other components of cells, such as proteins and RNA molecules. The DNA segments that carry this genetic information are called genes, and their location within the genome are referred to as genetic loci, but other DNA sequences have structural purposes, or are involved in regulating the use of this genetic information.

Geneticists, including plant geneticists, use this sequence of DNA to their advantage to better find and understand the role of different genes within a given genome. Through research and plant breeding, manipulation of different plant genes and loci encoded by the DNA sequence of the plant chromosomes by various methods can be done to produce different or desired genotypes that result in different or desired phenotypes.

Plant Specific Genetics 
Plants, like all other known living organisms, pass on their traits using DNA. Plants however are unique from other living organisms in the fact that they have chloroplasts. Like mitochondria, chloroplasts have their own DNA. Like animals, plants experience somatic mutations regularly, but these mutations can contribute to the germ line with ease, since flowers develop at the ends of branches composed of somatic cells. People have known of this for centuries, and mutant branches are called "sports". If the fruit on the sport is economically desirable, a new cultivar may be obtained.

Some plant species are capable of self-fertilization, and some are nearly exclusively self-fertilizers. This means that a plant can be both mother and father to its offspring, a rare occurrence in animals. Scientists and hobbyists attempting to make crosses between different plants must take special measures to prevent the plants from self-fertilizing. In plant breeding, people create hybrids between plant species for economic and aesthetic reasons. For example, the yield of Corn has increased nearly five-fold in the past century due in part to the discovery and proliferation of hybrid corn varieties. Plant genetics can be used to predict which combination of plants may produce a plant with Hybrid vigor, or conversely many discoveries in Plant genetics have come from studying the effects of hybridization.

Plants are generally more capable of surviving, and indeed flourishing, as polyploids. Polyploid organisms have more than two sets of homologous chromosomes. For example, humans have two sets of homologous chromosomes, meaning that a typical human will have 2 copies each of 23 different chromosomes, for a total of 46. Wheat on the other hand, while having only 7 distinct chromosomes, is considered a hexaploid and has 6 copies of each chromosome, for a total of 42.  In animals, inheritable germline polyploidy is less common, and spontaneous chromosome increases may not even survive past fertilization. In plants however this is less of a problem. Polyploid individuals are created frequently by a variety of processes; however, once created, they usually cannot cross back to the parental type. Polyploid individuals that are capable of self-fertilizing can give rise to a new, genetically distinct lineage, which can be the start of a new species. This is often called "instant speciation". Polyploids generally have larger fruit, an economically desirable trait, and many human food crops, including wheat, maize, potatoes, peanuts, strawberries and tobacco, are either accidentally or deliberately created polyploids.

Model organisms

Arabidopsis thaliana

Arabidopsis thaliana, also known as thale cress, has been the model organism for the study of plant genetics. As Drosophila, a species of fruit fly, was to the understanding of early genetics, so has been A. thaliana to the understanding of plant genetics. It was the first plant to ever have its genome sequenced in the year 2000. It has a small genome, making the initial sequencing more attainable. It has a genome size of 125 Mbp that encodes about 25,000 genes. Because an incredible amount of research has been done on the plant, a database called The Arabidopsis Information Resource (TAIR) has been established as a repository for multiple data sets and information on the species. Information housed in TAIR include the complete genome sequence along with gene structure, gene product information, gene expression, DNA and seed stocks, genome maps, genetic and physical markers, publications, and information about the A. thaliana research community. Many natural inbred accessions of A. thaliana (often referred to as "ecotypes") are available and have been useful in genetic research. This natural variation has been used to identify loci important in both biotic and abiotic stress resistance.

Brachypodium distachyon 
Brachypodium distachyon is an experimental model grass that has many attributes that make it an excellent model for temperate cereals. Unlike wheat, a tetra or hexaploid species, brachypodium is diploid with a relatively small genome (~355 Mbp) with a short life-cycle, making genomic studies on it simpler.

Nicotiana benthamiana 
Nicotiana benthamiana is a popular model organism for both plant-pathogen and transgenic studies. Because its broad leaves are easily transiently transformed with Agrobacterium tumefaciens, it is used to study both the expression of pathogen genes introduced into a plant or test new genetic cassette effects.

Other model plants 
Other models include the alga Chlamydomonas reinhardtii,
the moss Physcomitrella patens,
the clover Medicago truncatula,
Antirrhinum majus (snapdragon),
the C4 grass Setaria viridis,
and maize (corn).

Genetically modified crops

Genetically modified (GM) foods are produced from organisms that have had changes introduced into their DNA using the methods of genetic engineering. Genetic engineering techniques allow for the introduction of new traits as well as greater control over traits than previous methods such as selective breeding and mutation breeding.

Genetically modifying plants is an important economic activity: in 2017, 89% of corn, 94% of soybeans, and 91% of cotton produced in the US were from genetically modified strains. Since the introduction of GM crops, yields have increased by 22%, and profits have increased to farmers, especially in the developing world, by 68%. An important side effect of GM crops has been decreased land requirements,

Commercial sale of genetically modified foods began in 1994, when Calgene first marketed its unsuccessful Flavr Savr delayed-ripening tomato. Most food modifications have primarily focused on cash crops in high demand by farmers such as soybean, corn, canola, and cotton. Genetically modified crops have been engineered for resistance to pathogens and herbicides and for better nutrient profiles. Other such crops include the economically important GM papaya which are resistant to the highly destructive Papaya ringspot virus, and the nutritionally improved golden rice (it is however still in development).

There is a scientific consensus that currently available food derived from GM crops poses no greater risk to human health than conventional food, but that each GM food needs to be tested on a case-by-case basis before introduction. Nonetheless, members of the public are much less likely than scientists to perceive GM foods as safe. The legal and regulatory status of GM foods varies by country, with some nations banning or restricting them, and others permitting them with widely differing degrees of regulation. There are still ongoing public concerns related to food safety, regulation, labeling, environmental impact, research methods, and the fact that some GM seeds are subject to intellectual property rights owned by corporations.

Modern ways to genetically modify plants

Genetic modification has been the cause for much research into modern plant genetics, and has also led to the sequencing of many plant genomes. Today there are two predominant procedures of transforming genes in organisms: the "Gene gun" method and the Agrobacterium method.

"Gene gun" method

The gene gun method is also referred to as "biolistics" (ballistics using biological components). This technique is used for in vivo (within a living organism) transformation and has been especially useful in monocot species like corn and rice. This approach literally shoots genes into plant cells and plant cell chloroplasts. DNA is coated onto small particles of gold or tungsten approximately two micrometers in diameter. The particles are placed in a vacuum chamber and the plant tissue to be engineered is placed below the chamber. The particles are propelled at high velocity using a short pulse of high pressure helium gas, and hit a fine mesh baffle placed above the tissue while the DNA coating continues into any target cell or tissue.

Agrobacterium method
Transformation via Agrobacterium has been successfully practiced in dicots, i.e. broadleaf plants, such as soybeans and tomatoes, for many years. Recently it has been adapted and is now effective in monocots like grasses, including corn and rice. In general, the Agrobacterium method is considered preferable to the gene gun, because of a greater frequency of single-site insertions of the foreign DNA, which allows for easier monitoring. In this method, the tumor inducing (Ti) region is removed from the T-DNA (transfer DNA) and replaced with the desired gene and a marker, which is then inserted into the organism. This may involve direct inoculation of the tissue with a culture of transformed Agrobacterium, or inoculation following treatment with micro-projectile bombardment, which wounds the tissue.  Wounding of the target tissue causes the release of phenolic compounds by the plant, which induces invasion of the tissue by Agrobacterium. Because of this, microprojectile bombardment often increases the efficiency of infection with Agrobacterium.  The marker is used to find the organism which has successfully taken up the desired gene. Tissues of the organism are then transferred to a medium containing an antibiotic or herbicide, depending on which marker was used. The Agrobacterium present is also killed by the antibiotic. Only tissues expressing the marker will survive and possess the gene of interest. Thus, subsequent steps in the process will only use these surviving plants. In order to obtain whole plants from these tissues, they are grown under controlled environmental conditions in tissue culture. This is a process of a series of media, each containing nutrients and hormones. Once the plants are grown and produce seed, the process of evaluating the progeny begins. This process entails selection of the seeds with the desired traits and then retesting and growing to make sure that the entire process has been completed successfully with the desired results.

See also

Apomixis
Biological engineering
Biotechnology
Cloning
DuPont
Eugenics
Experimental evolution
Gene flow
Gene pool
Genetic erosion
Genetic pollution
Genetically modified organisms
Human genetic engineering
Ice-minus bacteria
List of emerging technologies
Marker assisted selection
Monsanto Company
Paratransgenesis
Recombinant DNA
Research ethics
Synthetic biology
Transgene

References

External links

Ministry for the Environment NZ – Report of the Royal Commission on Genetic Modification, 2001